The Wiki Way: Quick Collaboration on the Web is a 2001 book about wikis by Bo Leuf and Ward Cunningham. It was the first major book published about using wikis. Cunningham invented wikis when he wrote WikiWikiWeb, the first wiki website software. 

The book is about how to manage wiki systems, followed by a perspective on the nature of wiki-style online communication.

References

Leuf, Bo; Cunningham, Ward. The Wiki Way

External links
Book homepage
Copy of the book in Archive.org

Wikis
Books about the Internet
2001 non-fiction books
Addison-Wesley books